Spas is a village (selo) in Sambir Raion, Lviv Oblast, of Western Ukraine. It belongs to Staryi Sambir urban hromada, one of the hromadas of Ukraine. The total area of the village is 0.62 km2, and the population is around 493 people. The local government is administered by the Tershivska village council.

Geography 
The village is located in the mountainous terrain of the Staryi Sambir Raion along the left (west) bank of the Dniester River. This area is also known as the Carpathian Foothills.

History and attractions 
The village is known to have existed since at least the year 1295.  In 1301, Knyaz Leo I of Galicia (ca. 1228 – ca. 1301)  died in the town.

Until 18 July 2020, Spas belonged to Staryi Sambir Raion. The raion was abolished in July 2020 as part of the administrative reform of Ukraine, which reduced the number of raions of Lviv Oblast to seven. The area of Staryi Sambir Raion was merged into Sambir Raion.

A few kilometers south of the village is a geological landmark called the Spassky Stone.

On July 28, 2013 a commemorative stone and memorable tablet was created and consecrated in the village of Spas to commemorate the 1025th anniversary of the baptism of Kievan Rus.

References

External links 
 village Spas
 Старосамбірщина, село Спас 
 weather.in.ua

Literature 
 Історія міст і сіл УРСР : Львівська область, Тершів. – К. : ГРУРЕ, 1968 р. Page 787 

Villages in Sambir Raion